Devil's Bedstead East, at  above sea level is the fifth-highest peak in the Pioneer Mountains of the U.S. state of Idaho. It is the 21st-highest peak in Idaho.

References 

Mountains of Idaho
Mountains of Custer County, Idaho
Salmon-Challis National Forest